Oxychilus hydatinus is a species of air-breathing land snail, a terrestrial pulmonate gastropod mollusk in the family Oxychilidae.

Distribution 
This species is known to occur in:
 Hungary
 Slovakia

References

Oxychilus